Igor Aleksandrovich Mazepa (born 2 July 1976) is the director general of the Concorde Capital investment company in Kyiv, Ukraine.

Biography
He graduated from Kyiv National Economic University having completed graduation programs in International Economics and Law.

In 1997 he started his career of investment banker in Russian – American Investment Company Prospect Investments. In 2000—2002 he worked in the position of Managing Director at IC Foyil Securities New Europe, and then as director of  IC IFC (International Financial Corporation).

In 2004 he founded and became Director General of IC Concorde Capital. Many years the company retains the position of one of three best investment banks of Ukraine (according to the largest international information agency Thomson Reuters).

In 2008 he was elected as Chairman of the exchange committee of the Ukrainian Exchange,  and at present he continues to act in this capacity.

In July–September  2014 he acted as a member  of the Supervisory Committee of PJSC Alfa-Bank.

In 2010 he participated in the project of  ICTV channel “Ukrainian Dream” as one of investors of  promising business ideas of common Ukrainians.

The best manager in the exchange market of Ukraine as ranked by the publishing house “Economics”, in  2007- winner in the nomination “Personality of  the exchange market of Ukraine” of the financial rating of Business magazine.

Igor Mazepa's business name was involved in numerous scandals. In 2015 Igor Mazepa's corporation Concorde Capital founded a forex broker PrivateFX,
which became a technical successor of the scandalously ruined financial pyramid Forex Trend Limited 
developed in 2011 by the arrested financial criminal Pavel Krymov.      
The information about Igor Mazepa's 100% stake in the capital of the PrivateFX was 
publicly confirmed by CEO of PrivateFX Alexander Bykov.
In April 2017 Igor Mazepa made a technical sale of PrivateFX to the unknown  front company 
Prime Broker, without having closed the obligations to investors for almost $18 Millions.

References

1976 births
Living people
Ukrainian investors
Kyiv National Economic University alumni